The Allegheny Institute for Public Policy is a conservative American think tank based in Western Pennsylvania. Using its expertise in economic development, tax increment financing, and eminent domain, it works with property owners and taxpayers to bring free market solutions to local government.

The Institute performs detailed research on local policy issues, then publishes its findings in reports and policy briefs. Unlike many think tanks, it actively promotes its findings by providing this information to local policy makers.

The institute was founded in 1995 by economist, Jerry Bowyer. In 1997, its activities contributed substantially to the defeat of a proposed regional tax referendum to fund the construction of sports stadiums. Several cities have nevertheless gone on to build private stadiums with private money, proving in hindsight how shortsighted their efforts were.

In 1999 and 2000, the institute publicly stated concerns about the prospect of a merger between Bell Atlantic and GTE. The institute and other institutions formed a coalition to investigate how the merger would affect consumers. The institute supports utility competition and created a special organization called the Center for Competitive Markets in 1998 to serve as a public "watchdog" around utility competition issues.

References

External links
 Allegheny Institute for Public Policy web site
 Organizational Profile – National Center for Charitable Statistics (Urban Institute)

Political and economic think tanks in the United States
1995 establishments in Pennsylvania
Organizations based in Pittsburgh